Cochylimorpha triangulifera is a species of moth of the family Tortricidae. It is found in the Russian Far East (Ussuri).

References

Moths described in 1966
Cochylimorpha
Moths of Asia